Neochalcosia witti is a moth in the family Zygaenidae. It is found in China (Sichuan, Shaanxi).

The wingspan is 42–58 mm for males and about 52 mm for females. Both the fore- and hindwings have a white band.

Etymology
The species is named for Mr. Thomas J. Witt, the founder of the Museum Witt in Munich.

References

Moths described in 2010
Chalcosiinae